Stever may refer to:

Places
 Stever, a river in Germany
 Stever Ridge, ridge in Victoria Land in Antarctica

People
 Guyford Stever (1916–2010), American administrator, physicist, educator, and engineer
 Johann Stever (1889–c.1945), German officer during World War II
 Margo Taft Stever, American poet
 Michael Stever, American film director, cinematographer, producer, writer, and actor
 Travis Stever (born 1978), lead guitarist for American rock band Coheed and Cambria

Other
 Willoughby v. Stever, American legal case